Adebola Babatunde Ekanola (born 2 December 1969) is a Nigerian professor of philosophy whose research area is ethics, social and political philosophy with special interest on issues relating to peace and social development in Africa. He is a former acting head of the department of philosophy, former dean of Faculty of Arts, and former director of the Office of International Programmes in the University of Ibadan. Ekanola was appointed acting vice-chancellor the University of Ibadan in November, 2020. He is the national coordinator of the Network of Directors of Internationalization in Nigerian Universities (NODINU).

Early life and education

Acting vice chancellor at University of Ibadan 
On 30 November 2020, he was appointed, by the University Council on the recommendation of the University Senate, as the acting vice-chancellor of the University of Ibadan to succeed Professor Abel Idowu Olayinka, a Nigerian professor of applied geophysics whose tenure ended on 30 November 2020.

References

Living people
1969 births
Vice-Chancellors of the University of Ibadan
Academic staff of the University of Ibadan
University of Ibadan alumni